Dominik Schmidt (born 1 July 1987) is a German professional footballer who plays as a defender for Atlas Delmenhorst.

Career
In June 2015, it was announced Schmidt would join 3. Liga side Holstein Kiel from Preußen Münster for the 2015–16 season having signed a two-year contract.

In March 2017, Schmidt agreed a contract extension until 2019 with Holstein Kiel.

In April 2020, it was announced that Holstein Kiel would not extend his contract beyond the 2019–20 season. He signed for MSV Duisburg on 18  August 2020. He left Duisburg on mutual consent in January 2022.

Schmidt moved to Regionalliga Nord club Atlas Delmenhorst in late January 2022. He signed a 1.5-year contract with the option of a further year.

Career statistics

References

External links

Dominik Schmidt at eintracht.de 

1987 births
Living people
Association football defenders
German footballers
Footballers from Berlin
SV Werder Bremen players
SV Werder Bremen II players
Eintracht Frankfurt players
Eintracht Frankfurt II players
SC Preußen Münster players
Holstein Kiel players
MSV Duisburg players
Atlas Delmenhorst players
Bundesliga players
3. Liga players
2. Bundesliga players
Regionalliga players